Bansi Birju is a 1972 Bollywood romance film directed by Prakash Verma. The film stars Amitabh Bachchan and Jaya Bachchan.

Plot

Cast 
Amitabh Bachchan as Birju
Jaya Bhaduri as Bansi
Anwar Ali
Ramesh Bhatia as Police inspector
Ramesh Deo
Rajan Haksar
Nigar Sultana

Soundtrack

References

External links 
 

1972 films
1970s Hindi-language films
1970s romance films
Indian romance films
Hindi-language romance films